Antonio Giustiniani, O.P (died 1571) was a Roman Catholic prelate who served as Archbishop (Personal Title) of Lipari (1564–1571) and Archbishop of Naxos (1562–1564).

Biography
Antonio Giustiniani was ordained a priest in the Order of Preachers.
On 16 December 1562, he was appointed during the papacy of Pope Pius IV as Archbishop of Naxos.
On 12 May 1564, he was appointed during the papacy of Pope Pius IV as Archbishop (Personal Title) of Lipari.
He served as Archbishop of Lipari until his death in 1571.

References

External links and additional sources
 (for Chronology of Bishops) 
 (for Chronology of Bishops) 
 (for Chronology of Bishops) 
 (for Chronology of Bishops) 

16th-century Roman Catholic archbishops in Sicily
Bishops appointed by Pope Pius IV
1571 deaths
Dominican bishops
Roman Catholic archbishops of Naxos
16th-century Roman Catholic archbishops in the Republic of Venice